Tollcross Primary School (Scottish Gaelic: Bunsgoil Crois na Cìse) is a mixed non-denominational primary school on Fountainbridge near Tollcross in Edinburgh, which offered the only Gaelic medium primary education in Edinburgh and the Lothians until this medium got its own facility called Bun-sgoil Taobh na Pàirce situated at the old Bonnington primary building.

References

City of Edinburgh Council (2005) Quality development review : Tollcross Primary School
Scottish Parliament: Tollcross Primary School visit to Education Service
Welcome to Learning in Gaelic medium Pre-school Education with the City of Edinburgh Council

External links
Tollcross Primary School
Tollcross Primary School's page on Scottish Schools Online
Tollcross Community Education Centre

Educational institutions established in 1912
Primary schools in Edinburgh
Category B listed buildings in Edinburgh
Scottish Gaelic education
1912 establishments in Scotland
Listed schools in Scotland
School buildings completed in 1912